Lucas Gabriel Monzón Lemos (born 29 September 2001) is a Uruguayan professional footballer who plays as a defender for Danubio.

Club career
Born in Jaguarão, Brazil, Monzón began his career in the youth ranks of Juventud prior to joining Danubio. A youth academy graduate of Danubio, Monzón made his professional debut on 14 August 2020 in Danubio's 2–1 win against Montevideo City Torque.

In April 2021, Monzón joined Montevideo Wanderers on a season long loan deal. On 29 June 2021, Monzón made his debut for Wanderers, appearing as a starter in a 1-0 victory over Cerrito.

On 5 August 2021, Monzón joined Major League Soccer club New York Red Bulls on a loan deal until the end of 2022 season. On 18 July 2022, New York and Monzón mutually agreed to terminate his loan at the club early.

International career
Monzón is a former Uruguay youth international.

Career statistics

Club

References

External links
 

2001 births
Living people
Association football defenders
Uruguayan footballers
Uruguayan Primera División players
Major League Soccer players
Danubio F.C. players
Montevideo Wanderers F.C. players
New York Red Bulls players
Uruguayan expatriate footballers
Uruguayan expatriate sportspeople in the United States
Expatriate soccer players in the United States